Puneet is an Indian name and it may refer to 
 Puneet Beniwal, Indian actor
 Puneet Bisht, Indian cricketer
 Puneet Datey, Indian cricketer
 Puneet Issar, Indian actor
 Puneet Mehra, Indian cricketer
 Puneet Nath Datt, Indian army officer
 Puneet Singh Ratn, Indian actor
 Puneet Sira, Film director